Billy M. Davis (born 1938) is a family farmer and attorney from Laurel, Mississippi associated with perennial candidate Lyndon LaRouche. Davis ran on the LaRouche platform for Governor of Mississippi in 1983. In the 1984 presidential election, Davis served as LaRouche's running mate. After an unsuccessful bid for the Democratic Party nomination, they ran as independents in the general election.

References 

1938 births
Living people
LaRouche movement
Mississippi Democrats
People from Laurel, Mississippi
1984 United States vice-presidential candidates
20th-century American politicians